Events from the year 2003 in Pakistan.

Incumbents

Federal government
President: Pervez Musharraf 
Prime Minister: Zafarullah Khan Jamali
Chief Justice: Sheikh Riaz Ahmad (until 31 December), Nazim Hussain Siddiqui

Governors
Governor of Balochistan – 
 until 29 January: Amir-ul-Mulk Mengal
 29 January-11 August: Abdul Qadir Baloch 
 starting 11 August: Owais Ahmed Ghani
Governor of Khyber Pakhtunkhwa – Iftikhar Hussain Shah 
Governor of Punjab – Khalid Maqbool 
Governor of Sindh – Ishrat-ul-Ibad Khan

Events

January
 An NGO launches a pilot mine clearance project in the Bajaur Agency.

March
 The Pakistan cricket team are not happy following their poor performance at the world cup, which led to them being knocked out in the first round. They were fined for their poor performance.

August
 Floods in Sindh province result in tens of thousands of people fleeing to relief camps and a food crisis. Badin District is the worst affected area.

September
 President Pervez Musharraf at the UN General Assembly in New York says that Pakistan would be willing to send troops to Iraq.

November
 The National Assembly of Pakistan meets for the first time since the 1999 coup.

Births
 15 February – Naseem Shah, cricketer
 11 October – Arisha Razi, actress

See also
2002 in Pakistan
Other events of 2003
2004 in Pakistan
Timeline of Pakistani history

References

 
Pakistan
Pakistan
2000s in Pakistan
Years of the 21st century in Pakistan